Soldier crab is a term used in different parts of the world for different crustaceans:
Pagurus bernhardus, a European hermit crab
Coenobita clypeatus, a Caribbean hermit crab
Dotilla myctiroides, a true crab from South-east Asia
several species of the genus Mictyris, an Indo-West Pacific genus of crabs:
In Australia, the term soldier crab generally refers to Mictyris longicarpus

Animal common name disambiguation pages